El Adde is a town in the southwestern Gedo region of Somalia.

Battle of El Adde 

On 15 January 2016, Al-Shabaab militants attacked a Kenyan military base in El Adde, killing 141–185 soldiers.

References

External links
Ceel Cadde
El Adde, Somalia

Populated places in Gedo